The current staging system for HIV infection in children was developed in 2005 and builds upon the staging system in place since 1987. A child is defined as someone under the age of 15. This staging system also requires the presence of HIV infection: HIV antibody for children aged 18 months or more; virological or p24 antigen positive test if aged under 18 months.

Clinical Stage 1
Asymptomatic

Persistent generalized lymphadenopathy

Clinical Stage 2
Hepatosplenomegaly

Papular pruritic eruptions

Seborrhoeic dermatitis

Extensive human papilloma virus infection

Extensive molluscum contagiosum

Fungal nail infections

Recurrent oral ulcerations

Lineal gingival erythema (LGE)

Angular cheilitis

Parotid enlargement

Herpes zoster

Recurrent or chronic RTIs (otitis media, otorrhoea, sinusitis)

Clinical Stage 3
Conditions where a presumptive diagnosis can be made on the basis of clinical signs or simple investigations

Moderate unexplained malnutrition not adequately responding to standard therapy

Unexplained persistent diarrhoea (14 days or more)

Unexplained persistent fever (intermittent or constant, for longer than one month)

Oral candidiasis (outside neonatal period)

Oral hairy leukoplakia

Acute necrotizing ulcerative gingivitis/periodontitis

Pulmonary TB

Severe recurrent presumed bacterial pneumonia

Conditions where confirmatory diagnostic testing is necessary

Chronic HIV-associated lung disease including bronchiectasis

Lymphoid interstitial pneumonitis (LIP)

Unexplained anaemia (<80g/L), and or neutropenia (<1000/µl) and or

thrombocytopenia (<50 000/µl) for more than one month

Clinical Stage 4
Conditions where a presumptive diagnosis can be made on the basis of clinical signs or simple investigations

Unexplained severe wasting or severe malnutrition not adequately responding to standard therapy

Pneumocystis pneumonia

Recurrent severe presumed bacterial infections (e.g. empyema, pyomyositis, bone or joint infection, meningitis, but excluding pneumonia)

Chronic herpes simplex infection; (orolabial or cutaneous of more than one month’s duration)

Extrapulmonary Tuberculosis

Kaposi’s sarcoma

Oesophageal candidiasis

Central nervous system toxoplasmosis (outside the neonatal period)

HIV encephalopathy

Conditions where confirmatory diagnostic testing is necessary

HCMV infection (CMV retinitis or infection of organs other than liver, spleen or lymph nodes; onset at age one month or more)

Extrapulmonary cryptococcosis including meningitis

Any disseminated endemic mycosis (e.g. extrapulmonary histoplasmosis, coccidiomycosis, penicilliosis)

Cryptosporidiosis

Isosporiasis

Disseminated non-tuberculous mycobacteria infection

Candida of trachea, bronchi or lungs

Visceral herpes simplex infection

Acquired HIV associated rectal fistula

Cerebral or B cell non-Hodgkin lymphoma

Progressive multifocal leukoencephalopathy (PML)

HIV-associated cardiomyopathy or HIV-associated nephropathy

The presumptive diagnosis above is designed for use where access to confirmatory diagnostic testing for HIV infection by means of virological testing (usually nucleic acid testing, NAT) or P24 antigen testing for infants and children aged under 18 months is not readily available.

References
 

HIV/AIDS
World Health Organization